The European Financial data Institute (Institut européen de données financières), known as EUROFIDAI is a research institute funded by the CNRS (French National Center for Scientific Research) as one of its service units (UPS 3390). Its mission is to develop European stock exchange databases that are useful to academic researchers in finance.

Stock exchange databases 
The EUROFIDAI website makes available European market databases for stocks, financial indexes, exchange rates, mutual funds, and corporate actions. The institute works to create verified, controlled and homogeneous databases, and maintain them over the long periods necessary for academic research.

Since January 2012, the institute has led the Base Européenne de DOnnées FInancières à Haute fréquence (BEDOFIH) project, which aims to create a European intraday financial database. This project is funded as one of 36 projects within the framework of the "Excellence facilities" (Equipex), program launched by the French government.

High performance computing 
To process the data, the institute has high output computing capabilities, available to researchers who are interested in short term access to high performance and volume computing. Thanks to cloud computing technology, the institute can provide researchers with an on-demand computer cluster for the required short period.

Document database 
Another Euroidai mission consists of building a bibliographical database on the research production in finance in European universities and research centers, indexing finance theses and working papers since the year 2000, along with  links to the original documents.

International Paris Finance Meeting 
EUROFIDAI, in association with the French Finance Association (AFFI), organizes the International Paris Finance Meeting in December every year, giving platform for researchers in finance to present their latest research.

References

External links 
 European Financial data Institute
 CNRS (French National Center for Scientific Research)
 AFFI (French Finance Association)

Information technology organizations based in Europe
Market data
Science and technology in Grenoble
Finance in France
Organizations established in 2003